Jason Atherton (born 6 September 1971) is an English chef and restaurateur. His flagship restaurant Pollen Street Social gained a Michelin Star in 2011, its opening year. He was the Executive Chef at Gordon Ramsay's Michelin starred Maze in London until 30 April 2010. In 2014 he co-hosted the Sky Living TV series My Kitchen Rules.

Early life and education
Atherton was born in Sheffield, South Yorkshire.

The son of a Skegness hotelier and her joiner husband, Atherton ran away to London at the age of 16 while his parents were on holiday. After training at Boston College, Lincolnshire, he spent six weeks training with the Army Catering Corps, which he hated.

Career
Jason Atherton has worked with chefs including Pierre Koffmann, Nico Ladenis, and Marco Pierre White. He joined the Gordon Ramsay Group in 2001 as the executive chef for Verre in Dubai.  In 2005, Jason returned to the UK and opened Maze.

In November 2007, Atherton and Gordon Ramsay oversaw the launch of Maze in the Hilton Prague Old Town. April 2008 saw the launch of Maze Grill, which sits alongside maze in Grosvenor Square. In 2009 Atherton opened Maze in Cape Town at the One and Only Hotel and also maze restaurants in Melbourne and Qatar.

Atherton left Gordon Ramsay Holdings in 2010 to launch his own restaurant company, The Social Company. He launched his first independent restaurant venture, Table No. 1, at the Waterhouse at South Bund hotel in Shanghai in May 2010. His flagship restaurant has been awarded one Michelin star, Pollen Street Social, opened in April 2011 in Mayfair. The restaurant has been ranked at number six in The Good Food Guide's Top 50 Restaurants 2013 & 2014 and number three in the 2016 guide. It was deemed London's best new fine dining restaurant in the Time Out Eating & Drinking Awards 2011 and won New Restaurant of the Year at the Craft Guild of Chefs Awards 2012. The restaurant has 4 AA Rosettes and has been named the BMW Square Meal Restaurant of the Year 2011. In 2014 the restaurant won Food and Travel Magazine Readers Award's "Restaurant of the Year - UK" and Jason Atherton won Restaurateur of the Year at the Catey's

Between 2011 and 2012, Atherton expanded his Asian ventures with Esquina, a tapas bar in Chinatown, Singapore, The Study, a British style cafe, also in Singapore and 22 Ships with Yenn Wong of JIA Group, in Hong Kong.

In 2013, Atherton opened two different ventures in London. The first was Little Social, a French brasserie-style restaurant located opposite his flagship restaurant. A short while later he opened the more casual modern British restaurant, Social Eating House, on Soho's Poland Street, as well as his second venue in Shanghai, The Commune Social, headed by Chef Scott Melvin, formerly of Table No. 1 and Ham & Sherry, his second Hong Kong restaurant. In the autumn of 2013, Atherton launched Berners Tavern within the London EDITION hotel.

2014 saw the openings of 2 new members in the "Social" restaurant family with City Social in Tower 42, London, which won a Michelin star within six months of opening, and Aberdeen Street Social in Hong Kong.

In 2015, Atherton opened his first stateside restaurant The Clocktower within the New York EDITION hotel at the Metropolitan Life Insurance Company Building. This was followed by Social Wine & Tapas in London's Marylebone, a casual tapas bar and wine shop. In September, Jason opened his first 'Social' restaurant in Dubai, Marina Social, within the new Intercontinental Dubai Marina.

In June 2016, Atherton opened his first restaurant in Cebu, Philippines - The Pig and Palm is a 70-seater with a chefs table, tapas bar, main dining area and a lounge area, designed by architect Lyndon Neri of Neri and Hu, who also designed Atherton's other restaurants Pollen Street Social, Sosharu and Kensington Street Social. This restaurant serves as his love letter to his wife, who is from Cebu. Atherton opened the Temple and Sons restaurant in London in November, 2016. 

Atherton's recipes and articles have appeared widely in magazines and newspapers including: The Guardian, The Sunday Times, The Observer Food Monthly, Waitrose Food Illustrated, Caterer and Hotelkeeper.  Additionally, he demonstrates regularly on food shows in the UK and abroad.  He is a regular guest on "Saturday Kitchen" and in June 2008, Jason won the third hugely popular series of BBC2's "Great British Menu", cooking both the starter and main courses at the "Gherkin" building in London. In 2009 and 2010 Atherton returned to "Great British Menu" as a host. He has also won "Chef Award" at the Catey Awards 2012.

In 2017, in another collaboration with JIA Group, Atherton opened Duddell's London at St Thomas Church in London Bridge.

Books
 "Maze:  The Cookbook", published by Quadrille Publishing Ltd; hardback edition (18 April 2008)
 "Gourmet Food for a Fiver", published by Quadrille Publishing Ltd (16 April 2010)
 "Social Suppers", published by Absolute Press (19 June 2014)
 "Social Sweets", published by Absolute Press (18 June 2015)

Television
Atherton has become a regular guest on BBC One's Saturday Kitchen, alongside host James Martin.

In 2008, Atherton won the London and Southeast heat of the BBC Two programme Great British Menu – the judges were his old boss Oliver Peyton, alongside Prue Leith and Matthew Fort. He eventually won the starter and main course section in a public vote, in a meal served at The Gherkin, hosted by Heston Blumenthal.

In 2014 Jason Atherton co-hosted the UK series My Kitchen Rules with Lorraine Pascale. The series aired on Sky Living HD, the first show aired on Thursday 23 January 2014.

In 2016 Jason was a guest judge for an episode in series 8 of Masterchef Australia with 3 contestants having to re-create one of Jason's award-winning dishes in an elimination challenge.

In 2019 Atherton hosted the BBC show “The Chef’s Brigade” where he took a team of raw cooking talent and, in six weeks, tried to turn them into a Chefs’ Brigade to compete with Europe’s finest restaurants.

Awards

 1996: "Best Young Chef" in Britain by Jonathan Meades of The Sunday Times. 
 2000:  "Acorn Award", from The Caterer
 2000: "Young Guns Food Award", The Daily Express
 2001: "Best Chef of the Middle East", from Time Out Magazine, Dubai
 2006:  "Man of the Year", from Arena Magazine
 2008:  "London’s Outstanding Chef", from The Evening Standard
 2012:  "Chef Award" at The Catey Awards 2012
 2013: "Chef of the Year", GQ Awards
 2014: "Restaurateur of the Year", The Catey Awards

Personal life
Atherton lives in southwest London with his Filipino wife Irha and their three daughters.

References

External links
Jason Atherton's Official Website
Pollen Street Social
Jason Atherton's Official Twitter
Jason's Official Facebook Page
Interview with Jason Atherton on Hot Dinners about Pollen Street Social

1971 births
Living people
People from Worksop
English television chefs
Head chefs of Michelin starred restaurants
20th-century British Army personnel
Army Catering Corps soldiers